The James Madison Dukes men's soccer team is an intercollegiate varsity sports team of James Madison University. As of the 2022 season, the Dukes are members of the National Collegiate Athletic Association Division I Sun Belt Conference. They began play in 1968. The Dukes play their home games at Sentara Park.  During the 2011 Colonial Athletic Association men's soccer season, the Dukes won the regular season.

Notable alumni 
Nikola Budalić, former player/manager for Serbian White Eagles of the Canadian Soccer League
Kevin Knight, former MetroStars player in Major League Soccer (MLS)
Alan Mayer, former United States men's national soccer team member
Kurt Morsink, former D.C. United player in MLS
Hal Partenheimer, former Pittsburgh Spirit player in Major Indoor Soccer League
C. J. Sapong, current player for the Philadelphia Union in MLS. Won the 2011 MLS Rookie of the Year as a member of Sporting Kansas City and was capped twice by the U.S. national team in 2012
Joel Senior, Jamaica national team, plays for Harbour View F.C. of Jamaica National Premier League
Carl Strong, former Atlanta Chiefs player of North American Soccer League
Kevin Trapp, former Western Mass Pioneers and Charlotte Eagles of USL Championship
Paul Wyatt, current free agent who most recently played for Oklahoma City Energy of USL Pro
Nick Zimmerman, former Carolina Railhawks player of North American Soccer League

Honors 
 Virginia Intercollegiate Soccer Association Tournament
 Winners (4): 1972, 1973, 1974, 1975

References

External links
 

 
1968 establishments in Virginia
Association football clubs established in 1968